De Gregori is an album by Italian singer-songwriter Francesco De Gregori. It was released in 1978 by RCA Italia.

The album
De Gregori was released after a period in which the author had retired from music, working as a clerk in a bookshop. The composition of the album's most famous track, "Generale", convinced him to return as a full-time singer-songwriter.

"Raggio di sole" is dedicated to De Gregori's recently born twins. "Due zingari" features saxophone parts by the renowned Italian jazz musician Mario Schiano.

Track listing 

"Generale" – 4:19
"Natale" – 2:35
"L'impiccato" – 3:59
"Babbo in prigione" – 2:10
"Renoir" – 2:37
"Renoir (seconda versione)" – 2:22
"Il '56" – 3:05
"La campana" – 3:38
"Raggio di sole" – 3:08
"Due zingari" – 4:16

All songs written by Francesco De Gregori.

Personnel 

Francesco De Gregori – Vocals, Producer
Mario Scardala – Artwork
Mario Scotti – Bass (Electric)
George Sims – guitar

References

1978 albums
Francesco De Gregori albums
RCA Records albums